Sir Peter Thompson (30 October 1698 – 31 October 1770) was an English merchant, collector and MP.

He was a younger son of Captain Thomas Thompson of Poole, Dorset.

He became an eminent merchant in Bermondsey, London, trading in Hamburg and Newfoundland. He was made High Sheriff of Surrey for 1745-46 and knighted the same year. In 1746, he travelled to Berlin during the War of the Austrian Succession. He sat in Parliament as MP for St Albans from 1747 to 1754.

He built a large town house in Poole, now a grade I listed building, and became a collector and antiquary, being created a Fellow of the Society of Antiquaries and, in 1746, a Fellow of the Royal Society.

Thompson was a friend of Joseph Ames (author), and died unmarried and was succeeded by his brother James.

References

1698 births
1770 deaths
English merchants
English antiquarians
British MPs 1747–1754
High Sheriffs of Surrey
Fellows of the Royal Society
Fellows of the Society of Antiquaries of London